The Report of the committee of inquiry on industrial democracy (1977) Cmnd 6706, also the Bullock Report for short, was a report proposing for a form of worker participation or workers' control, chaired by Alan Bullock. The idea was seen by some as a way to solve the chronic industrial disputes and to enhance participation of employees in their workplace.

Background
A Committee of Enquiry into Industrial Democracy was set up by the Labour government of Harold Wilson in December 1975, in response to the European Commission's Draft Fifth Company Law Directive which sought to harmonise worker participation in management of companies across Europe. Its terms of reference started with the words,

Content
The committee, chaired by Bullock, published its report in January 1977. This report was not unanimous. The majority report was signed by Bullock and as members of the committee: three trade unionists, two academics and a city solicitor.

Majority report
The key idea was that in all boards of companies with over 2000 employees, there would be a right to have representation for workers. A company wide codetermination referendum would be held in firms with over 2000 employees, with the entire workforce voting. After approval, only union members would be able to vote for candidates to the supervisory board. Shareholders and unions would appoint x representatives each. The deadlock breaker would be an independent y appointee from the government.

The Report further recommended that nondelegable board functions would be codified as the right to submit resolutions to shareholders concerning (1) winding up (2) capital structure changes (3) article alterations (4) dividends (5) disposal of substantial parts of the business. The board, not management, should have exclusive control of (1) appointment of management and (2) disposition of resources not concerning rules on capital structure and dividends. Shareholders would retain a veto power, however, over such decisions.

Minority report
The minority report, produced by the three industrialists on the committee, proposed a second tier board for workers to have input on. They recommended election of representatives to be open to nonunion members.

Reception
The report was received with trepidation but not rejecting the principles laid down. In a publication of the City Company Law Committee, A reply to Bullock, the authors said,

The more people are able to influence decisions which closely affect their work the more effective will that involvement be; the more effective the involvement the greater the commitment to the company’s objectives which, in the final analysis, will be concerned with generating wealth or services for the community as a whole.

Nevertheless, they did not want direct participation because they viewed shareholders to be the "owners" of companies.

the fundamental basis of the joint stock company system... [is] a system based on the concept that the ultimate authority and control over a company rests with those who provide the capital (i.e. the shareholders) in general meeting. It is they who, at the outset, come together to incorporate the company as a legal entity and it is they who by the contract of incorporation embodied in the company’s original constitution agree between themselves what the company’s business and objects shall be and in what way the company shall be organised and managed.

There was also strong opposition to the report from many who might have been expected to support it, including the Institute for Workers' Control.

See also
British labour law
UK company law
Dunlop Commission (1994)

Notes

References
E Batstone, A Ferner and M Terry, Unions on the board: an experiment in industrial democracy (1983)
P Brannen, ‘Worker directors: an approach to analysis. The case of the British Steel Corporation’ in C Crouch and FA Heller, Organizational Democracy and Political Processes (Wiley 1983)
PL Davies, Lord Wedderburn, 'The Land of Industrial Democracy' (1977) 6(1) Industrial Law Journal 197-211
C Jenkins and B Sherman, Collective bargaining (London: Routledge and Kegan Paul 1977) .
E McGaughey, 'Votes at Work in Britain: Shareholder Monopolisation and the ‘Single Channel’' (2018) 47(1) Industrial Law Journal 76 
Lord Wedderburn, ‘Companies and employees: common law or social dimension’ (1993) 109 Law Quarterly Review 261

External links
Report of the Commission on Industrial Democracy (London, HMSO, 1977)
The Bullock Report 35 years on

United Kingdom company law
United Kingdom labour law
1977 in the United Kingdom
Reports of the United Kingdom government
1977 in labor relations